Jenkintown–Wyncote station (originally Jenkintown station) is a major SEPTA Regional Rail station along the SEPTA Main Line in Montgomery County, Pennsylvania. It is located at the intersection of Greenwood Avenue and West Avenue on the border of Jenkintown and the Wyncote neighborhood of Cheltenham Township, with a mailing address in Jenkintown. It is the ninth-busiest station in the regional rail system, and the fourth busiest outside Center City. Despite this, the station is not wheelchair accessible. SEPTA had plans to make the station wheelchair accessible by 2020, but these have not yet been completed.

Station
Jenkintown–Wyncote station was built in 1872 by the North Pennsylvania Railroad, and replaced in 1932 by the Reading Railroad. The 1932-built structure remains to this day, and was listed on the National Register of Historic Places in 2014. It currently lies in fare zone 3 and includes a parking lot with 450 spaces.  The West Trenton Line branches off of the SEPTA Main Line at this station.

Service
This station is served by the Lansdale/Doylestown Line, Warminster Line, and West Trenton Line.  These three rail lines make Jenkintown-Wyncote the ninth-busiest station in SEPTA's Regional Rail system, and the third-busiest outside the City of Philadelphia, with 1,246 average weekday boardings and 1,702 average weekday alightings in FY 2017.

Station layout
Jenkintown–Wyncote has two low-level side platforms connected by a tunnel underneath the tracks.

Gallery

References

External links

SEPTA – Jenkintown-Wyncote Station

SEPTA Regional Rail stations
Railway Station
Former Reading Company stations
Former Baltimore and Ohio Railroad stations
Railway stations in the United States opened in 1872
Railway stations in Montgomery County, Pennsylvania
Historic district contributing properties in Pennsylvania
National Register of Historic Places in Montgomery County, Pennsylvania
Stations on the SEPTA Main Line